Thomas O'Sullivan was an Australian politician.

Thomas or Tom(my) O'Sullivan may also refer to:

Sportspeople
Tom O'Sullivan (Dingle Gaelic footballer), Kerry Gaelic footballer
Tom O'Sullivan (Rathmore Gaelic footballer) (born 1978), Kerry Gaelic footballer
Tom O'Sullivan (hurler), Irish hurler
Tommy O'Sullivan (born 1995), Welsh footballer

Other
Tom O'Sullivan (actor), Australian television, film and theatre actor
Thomas C. O'Sullivan (1858–1913), American politician

See also
Thomas Sullivan (disambiguation)